R&B Skeletons in the Closet is the fourth solo album by Parliament-Funkadelic leader George Clinton. It was released in April 1986 by Capitol Records and was the last album that Clinton would record for the label. Recording sessions for the album utilized a small cadre of P-Funk musicians including Bootsy Collins, Garry Shider, and DeWayne "Blackbyrd" McKnight, as well as the debut recorded appearance of former Miss America Vanessa L. Williams on the opening track "Hey Good Lookin'". R&B Skeletons in the Closet was produced by Clinton, Steve Washington, Shider, and Andre Jackson.

The album's concept deals with black musical artists attempts to "cross over" to white audiences and losing their core black audience in the process. R&B Skeletons in the Closet expands on the dance-funk sound of Clinton's previous solo albums, and it also incorporates elements of electro and hip hop music. The album was reissued on CD by Capitol Records in 1991, but went out of print shortly thereafter.

Track listing
"Hey Good Lookin'" (Steve Washington, George Clinton, Garry Shider) (released as single Capitol 5602 and as a 12" single-Capitol 9729)
"Do Fries Go with That Shake?" (Steve Washington, Sheila Washington, George Clinton) (released as single Capitol 5558 and as a 12" single-Capitol SPRO 9628)
"Mix Master Suite: a) Startin' From Scratch, b) Counter Irritant, c) Nothin' Left To Burn" (George Clinton)
"Electric Pygmies" (George Clinton)
"Intense" (George Clinton) (originally featured on the soundtrack to the movie Iron Eagle)
"Cool Joe" (Kevin Burton, Andre Jackson, George Clinton)
"R&B Skeletons (In the Closet)" (George Clinton, David Spradley) (released as single Capitol 5642 and as a 12" single-Capitol V-15263)

Personnel
DeWayne McKnight, Bootsy Collins, Andre Williams, Stevie Salas, Jack Sherman - guitar
Steve Washington - bass
Joseph Fiddler, Andre Williams, Loic Gambas, Z O, Kevin Burton, Steve Washington, David Spradley - keyboards
Maceo Parker - saxophone, flute
Fred Wesley - trombone
Ed Johnson, Loic Gambas - piano
Lelan Zales - timbales
Steve Washington, Fred Johnson, Z O - drum programming
Anthony Bryant - scratch mix
Ed Johnson, John Johnson, Paula Hachalter, Jim Hay, Murray Adler, William Reichenbach, Donald Ashworth, Rick Marotta - mix-master orchestra
Kevin Burke, Shirley Jackson, Pat Lewis, Sandra Feva, Jessica Cleaves, Garry Shider, Joe Harris, Michael Payne, Andre Williams, Vanessa L. Williams, Debra Barsha, Bootsy Collins, Sheila Washington, Stefan Frank, Steve Boyd, Lige Curry, Robert "P-Nut" Johnson - vocals

Notes

References

External links
 R&B Skeletons in the Closet at Discogs
 R&B Skeletons in the Closet at The Motherpage
 Album Review at Los Angeles Times

George Clinton (funk musician) albums
1986 albums
Capitol Records albums
Albums with cover art by Pedro Bell